Jeffrey C. Manske is an American attorney who serves as a United States magistrate judge of the United States District Court for the Western District of Texas. He was appointed to this position on August 1, 2001, and his current term will expire on July 31, 2025. Judge Manske is a native of Waco, Texas, and was born there on November 19, 1961.  Judge Manske's great grandfather, C.C. Maxey, was Sheriff of McLennan County, Texas, from 1948-1972.

Background

Mankse received his Bachelor of Arts in philosophy from Baylor University in 1983 and his Juris Doctor degree from St. Mary's University School of Law in 1986. He is a former partner at the law firm of Brown McCarroll.

Manske is the founder and leader of the Veterans Endeavor for Treatment and Support (VETS) Court at Fort Hood, Texas.  Additionally, Judge Manske is also a consultant for Justice for Vets, a division of the National Association of Drug Court Professionals.

References 

Year of birth missing (living people)
Living people
Place of birth missing (living people)
United States magistrate judges
Baylor University alumni
St. Mary's University School of Law alumni